Matthew Charles Wiman (born September 19, 1983) is an American retired mixed martial artist who competed as a lightweight. He competed in the Ultimate Fighting Championship.

Background
Wiman graduated from Broken Arrow High School in 2002.

Mixed martial arts career

Early career
Matt began training mixed martial arts with UFC fighter, Mikey Burnett, at the Lion's Den in Tulsa, Oklahoma.

Wiman's initiation into professional fighting came on August 14, 2004. A relatively unknown fighter at the time, Matt entered the Extreme Fight Night tournament organized by kickboxer, Dale Cook. Matt won 3 fights that night to become the Extreme Fighting League Middleweight Champion. He defeated Joseph Garza and Greg Bossler, each by unanimous decision, before finishing Venn Johns by triangle choke for the championship belt.

Matt's first title defense came on November 13, 2004, when he defeated David Franks by armbar 42 seconds into the first round.

He defended the title again on February 5, 2005, with a 20-second KO of D.J. Randall.

Wiman first gained national attention at FFC 15-Fiesta Las Vegas on September 15, 2005 against fellow rising star Roger Huerta. It was a back and forth fight, with both fighters nearly finishing on several occasions. Matt lost a close decision. As a result of their impressive performances, Wiman and Huerta both caught the eyes of Dana White and UFC matchmaker, Joe Silva.

Wiman defended his Extreme Fight League championship belt for a third and final time on November 12, 2005 at Battle at the Brady 2 against Thomas Grissom. Matt won by referee stoppage in the 1st round due to multiple cuts sustained by Grissom.

Wiman's next fight was at MFC-Boardwalk Blitz on March 14, 2006 in Atlantic City, New Jersey against UFC veteran, Nick Agallar. Matt lost by unanimous decision.

Ultimate Fighting Championship
When an injury forced Leonard Garcia out of his scheduled fight with Spencer Fisher at UFC 60, Wiman agreed to replace Garcia on short notice. On May 27, 2006, Wiman lost to Fisher by KO in the second round.

The Ultimate Fighter Season 5
Wiman was a contestant on The Ultimate Fighter 5 show. He was the second pick (after Gray Maynard) for B.J. Penn's team. His preliminary fight was against Marlon Sims. Wiman landed a devastating overhand right in the opening seconds of the fight, climbed on the back of Sims and choked him unconscious. Wiman was defeated by eventual finalist Manvel Gamburyan of Team Pulver in the quarterfinals by decision. Gamburyan and Wiman exchanged takedowns, but Gamburyan was on top most of the fight and got the victory, despite Dana White's thoughts that Wiman could make it to the finals of the show.

Wiman fought Brian Geraghty on June 23, 2007 at The Ultimate Fighter 5 Finale. He took his opponent down early and worked a ground and pound attack. Wiman landed strikes in Geraghty's guard and passed to full mount, where he unloaded with punches, causing referee Yves Lavigne to stop the fight due to unanswered strikes at 2:09 of round 1.

Ultimate Fighting Championship
Wiman's next fight was against Japanese judoka Michihiro Omigawa at UFC 76. Wiman controlled the fight with takedowns and ground control, and won a unanimous decision.

His next fight was against Justin Buchholz at UFC Fight Night 12 on January 23, 2008. Wiman scored a takedown in the opening moments of the fight and worked quickly to the mount position. He landed an elbow below the right eye of Buchholz causing a cut. The UFC newcomer turned over to avoid further strikes to the face and Wiman secured the back position. After a brief struggle to secure the rear naked choke, Wiman forced Buchholz to submit at 2:58 of the first round, giving him his third straight UFC victory.

Wiman's next fight was against Thiago Tavares at UFC 85. After many back and forth grappling exchanges in round one, he eventually KO'd Tavares with a right hook in the second round.

At UFC: Fight for the Troops, Wiman lost a one-sided unanimous decision to fellow rising star, Jim Miller, replacing an injured Frankie Edgar.

On April 18, 2009, Wiman faced Canadian striker Sam Stout at UFC 97 in Montreal, Quebec. In a closely contested fight, Wiman seemed hurt from a flush liver shot late in round two, but rallied and controlled Stout for the final round. He lost via unanimous decision (29-28, 29-28, 29-28).

Woman was scheduled to fight Rafael dos Anjos on September 19, 2009, at UFC 103, but was forced to withdraw because of a knee injury. He was replaced by Rob Emerson.

On December 12, 2009, Wiman defeated Shane Nelson at UFC 107 via unanimous decision.

Wiman defeated Mac Danzig via first round submission at UFC 115. However, the stoppage was apparently premature and mistaken as Wiman had Danzig in a tight guillotine choke and referee Yves Lavigne called a stoppage despite the fact that Danzig had not submitted and was still conscious.

Wiman was expected to face Danzig in a rematch on September 15, 2010, at UFC Fight Night 22, however Danzig was forced off the card with an injury. Wiman was then set to face Efrain Escudero, but Wiman was also forced out of the bout with an injury and was replaced by Charles Oliveira.

Wiman was expected to face Cole Miller on January 1, 2011, at UFC 125, but the bout eventually took place on January 22, 2011 at UFC Fight Night 23. Wiman dominated Miller for all 3 rounds, resulting in a unanimous decision victory.

Wiman faced Dennis Siver on July 2, 2011, at UFC 132. He lost the fight via unanimous decision where UFC President Dana White stated he felt Wiman's pain at the post-fight press conference and understood why he wouldn't show up (to the post-fight press conference) after a fight like that.

Wiman won a rematch with Mac Danzig via unanimous decision on October 1, 2011, at UFC on Versus 6,. The back and forth action earned Fight of the Night honors.

Wiman was expected to face Mark Bocek on April 21, 2012 at UFC 145. However, Wiman was forced from the bout with an injury and was replaced by returning UFC veteran John Alessio.

Wiman defeated Paul Sass via first round armbar submission on September 29, 2012 at UFC on Fuel TV 5.

Wiman faced T. J. Grant on January 26, 2013 at UFC on Fox 6. He lost the fight via KO in the first round.

After an absence of nearly two years, Wiman returned from an extended hiatus and faced Isaac Vallie-Flagg at UFC Fight Night 57 on November 22, 2014. He won the back-and-forth fight via unanimous decision.

Wiman was expected to face Leonardo Santos on March 21, 2015 at UFC Fight Night 62.  However, Wiman was forced out of the bout on February 11 with a back injury and was replaced by Tony Martin.

Wiman returned from an extended hiatus and faced Luis Peña on June 22, 2019 at UFC on ESPN+ 12. He lost the fight via technical knockout in round three.

Wiman faced promotional newcomer Joe Solecki on December 7, 2019 at UFC on ESPN 7. He lost the fight via unanimous decision.

Wiman faced Jordan Leavitt on December 5, 2020 at UFC on ESPN 19. He lost the fight via knockout in round one.

After fighting out his last fight for the UFC, Matt announced his retirement from the sport.

Championships and accomplishments 
 Ultimate Fighting Championship
 Fight of the Night (Four times) vs. Thiago Tavares, Jim Miller, Sam Stout, Mac Danzig 
 Submission of the Night (One time) vs. Paul Sass

Mixed martial arts record

|Loss
|align=center|16–10
|Jordan Leavitt
|KO (slam)
|UFC on ESPN: Hermansson vs. Vettori
|
|align=center|1
|align=center|0:22
|Las Vegas, Nevada, United States
|
|-
|Loss
|align=center|16–9
|Joe Solecki
|Decision (unanimous)
|UFC on ESPN: Overeem vs. Rozenstruik 
|
|align=center|3
|align=center|5:00
|Washington, D.C., United States
|   
|-
|Loss
|align=center|16–8
|Luis Peña
|TKO (punches)
|UFC Fight Night: Moicano vs. Korean Zombie 
|
|align=center|3
|align=center|1:14
|Greenville, South Carolina, United States
|
|-
|Win
|align=center| 16–7
|Isaac Vallie-Flagg
| Decision (unanimous)
|UFC Fight Night: Edgar vs. Swanson
|
|align=center|3
|align=center|5:00
|Austin, Texas, United States
|
|-
|Loss
|align=center| 15–7
|T. J. Grant
|KO (elbows and punches)
|UFC on Fox: Johnson vs. Dodson
|
|align=center|1
|align=center|4:51
|Chicago, Illinois, United States
|
|-
|Win
|align=center| 15–6
|Paul Sass
|Submission (armbar)
|UFC on Fuel TV: Struve vs. Miocic
|
|align=center|1
|align=center|3:48
|Nottingham, England
|
|-
|Win
|align=center| 14–6
|Mac Danzig
|Decision (unanimous)
|UFC Live: Cruz vs. Johnson
|
|align=center|3
|align=center|5:00
|Washington D.C., United States
|
|-
|Loss
|align=center| 13–6
|Dennis Siver
|Decision (unanimous)
|UFC 132
|
|align=center|3
|align=center|5:00
|Las Vegas, Nevada, United States
|
|-
|Win
|align=center|13–5
|Cole Miller
|Decision (unanimous)
|UFC: Fight for the Troops 2
|
|align=center|3
|align=center|5:00
|Fort Hood, Texas, United States
|
|-
|Win
|align=center|12–5
|Mac Danzig
|Technical Submission (guillotine choke)
|UFC 115
|
|align=center|1
|align=center|1:45
|Vancouver, British Columbia, Canada
|
|-
|Win
|align=center|11–5
|Shane Nelson
|Decision (unanimous)
|UFC 107
|
|align=center|3
|align=center|5:00
|Memphis, Tennessee, United States
|
|-
|Loss
|align=center|10–5
|Sam Stout
|Decision (unanimous)
|UFC 97
|
|align=center|3
|align=center|5:00
|Montreal, Quebec, Canada
|
|-
|Loss
|align=center|10–4
|Jim Miller
|Decision (unanimous)
|UFC: Fight for the Troops
|
|align=center|3
|align=center|5:00
|Fayetteville, North Carolina, United States
|
|-
|Win
|align=center|10–3
|Thiago Tavares
|KO (punches)
|UFC 85
|
|align=center|2
|align=center|1:57
|London, England
|
|-
|Win
|align=center|9–3
|Justin Buchholz
|Submission (rear-naked choke)
|UFC Fight Night: Swick vs. Burkman
|
|align=center|1
|align=center|2:56
|Las Vegas, Nevada, United States
|
|-
|Win
|align=center|8–3
|Michihiro Omigawa
|Decision (unanimous)
|UFC 76
|
|align=center|3
|align=center|5:00
|Anaheim, California, United States
|
|-
|Win
|align=center|7–3
|Brian Geraghty
|TKO (punches)
|The Ultimate Fighter 5 Finale
|
|align=center|1
|align=center|2:09
|Las Vegas, Nevada, United States
|
|-
|Loss
|align=center|6–3
|Spencer Fisher
|KO (flying knee)
|UFC 60
|
|align=center|2
|align=center|1:43
|Los Angeles, California, United States
|
|-
|Loss
|align=center|6–2
| Nick Agallar
|Decision (unanimous)
|MFC: Boardwalk Blitz
|
|align=center|3
|align=center|5:00
|Atlantic City, New Jersey, United States
|
|-
|Win
|align=center|6–1
|Mark Thomas Grissom
|TKO (corner stoppage)
|XFL 18: Battle at the Brady 2
|
|align=center|1
|align=center|3:00
|Tulsa, Oklahoma, United States
|
|-
|Loss
|align=center|5–1
|Roger Huerta
|Decision (unanimous)
|FFC 15: Fiesta Las Vegas
|
|align=center|3
|align=center|5:00
|Las Vegas, Nevada, United States
|
|-
|Win
|align=center|5–0
|D.J. Randall
|TKO (punches)
|XFL: Xtreme Fighting 3: Superbrawl
|
|align=center|1
|align=center|0:20
|Miami, Oklahoma, United States
|
|-
|Win
|align=center|4–0
|David Frank
|Submission (armbar)
|XFL: EK 14: Heavyweight Gladiators
|
|align=center|1
|align=center|0:42
|Tulsa, Oklahoma, United States
|
|-
|Win
|align=center|3–0
|Venn Johns
|Submission (triangle choke)
|XFL: EK 13: Elimination
|
|align=center|2
|align=center|1:30
|Tulsa, Oklahoma, United States
|
|-
|Win
|align=center|2–0
|Greg Bossler
|Decision (unanimous)
|XFL: EK 13: Elimination
|
|align=center|3
|align=center|5:00
|Tulsa, Oklahoma, United States
|
|-
|Win
|align=center|1–0
|Joe Garza
|Decision (unanimous)
|XFL: EK 13: Elimination
|
|align=center|3
|align=center|5:00
|Tulsa, Oklahoma, United States
|
|-

See also
 List of male mixed martial artists

References

External links

 
 
 Matt Wiman's official website

Living people
1983 births
American male mixed martial artists
Mixed martial artists from Colorado
Lightweight mixed martial artists
Sportspeople from Denver
Sportspeople from Tulsa, Oklahoma
Ultimate Fighting Championship male fighters